Satagay is the name of several rural localities in the Sakha Republic, Russia:
Satagay, Amginsky District, Sakha Republic, a selo in Satagaysky Rural Okrug of Amginsky District
Satagay, Vilyuysky District, Sakha Republic, a selo in Kyrgydaysky Rural Okrug of Vilyuysky District